The Beisan Subdistrict was one of the subdistricts of Mandatory Palestine. It was located around the city of Baysan. After the 1948 Arab-Israeli War, the subdistrict disintegrated; most of it became part of Israel, and has been merged with the neighboring Nazareth Subdistrict to from the modern-day Jezre'el County. The southernmost parts, however, fell within the modern-day West Bank - because of that, they were first occupied and unilaterally annexed by Jordan, and were later occupied by Israel following the Six-day War.

Depopulated towns and villages 

 Arab al-'Arida
 Arab al-Bawati
 Arab al-Safa
 al-Ashrafiyya
 Al-Bira
 Beisan
 Danna
 Farwana
 al-Fatur
 al-Ghazzawiyya
 al-Hamidiyya
 Al-Hamra
 Jabbul
 Kafra
 Kawkab al-Hawa
 al-Khunayzir
 Masil al-Jizl
 al-Murassas
 Qumya
 al-Sakhina
 al-Samiriyya
 Sirin
 Tall al-Shawk
 Khirbat Al-Taqa
 al-Tira
 Umm 'Ajra
 Khirbat Umm Sabuna
 Yubla
 Zab'a
 Khirbat Zawiya

Subdistricts of Mandatory Palestine